Depression cake is a type of cake that was commonly made during the Great Depression.  The ingredients include little or no milk, sugar, butter, or eggs, because the ingredients were then either expensive or hard to obtain. Similar cakes are known as "War Cake", as they avoided ingredients that were scarce or were being conserved for the use of soldiers. A common depression cake is also known as "Boiled Raisin Cake", "Milkless, Eggless, Butterless Cake", or "Poor Man's Cake". "Boiled" refers to the boiling of raisins with the sugar and spices to make a syrup base early in the recipe. However, some bakers do include butter. Boiled raisin-type cakes date back at least to the American Civil War.

History
Depression cake has been referred to as "War Cake" by texts dating back to World War I. In a pamphlet distributed by the United States Food Administration in 1918 entitled "War Economy in Food", War Cake is listed under "Recipes for Conservation Sweets". The United States Food Administration stressed the importance of reducing sugar consumption during the war and offered molasses, corn syrup, and raisins in its place.

When the Great Depression hit America following the Stock Market Crash of 1929, families were forced to stretch their budgets and "make do" with minimal and cheap ingredients when it came to cooking. Some women were able to feed their families on $5 per week. Dessert became a luxury for most, and depression cake was a more affordable alternative to other cakes that used milk, eggs, and butter. Affordability was achieved through ingredient substitution. For example, shortening was substituted for butter, water was substituted for milk, and baking powder was substituted for eggs. Depression cake is just one of many examples of ingredient substitution during the Great Depression, as some women took full advantage of the practice by making mock foods such as mock apple pie and mock fish.

Radio shows and women's periodicals played a large role in circulating the recipe for depression cake during the Great Depression. Betty Crocker's Cooking Hour was one such show that provided women with budget-friendly recipes. General Mills, owner of Betty Crocker, employed nutritionists and cooks to experiment with different ways of "ruining" a cake, such as ingredient omission. 
Loring Schuler's Ladies' Home Journal was a publication that also offered baking tips during the Great Depression, recommending replacing eggs with baking powder and using inexpensive grains and produce.
A recipe titled "War Cake" was published in M.F.K. Fisher's book How to Cook a Wolf and republished in her The Art of Eating; it uses bacon grease on the premise that spices will mask its taste.

Today
Praised for its practicality and declared to be "the most worthwhile cake ever made," depression cake is still baked in modern America. The recipe for it has been featured in an array of publications such as The Telegraph-Herald, The Pittsburgh Press, and The Modesto Bee.

Ingredients and recipe
Some commonly used ingredients in depression cake:

white sugar,
brown sugar,
molasses, 
corn syrup,
strong coffee, water, or apple juice,
shortening or lard
dark raisins or diced pitted prunes,
apple,
unsifted all-purpose flour,
rye flour,
salt
baking soda,
baking powder,
cinnamon,
allspice,
clove,
nutmeg,
chopped walnuts, almonds, or pecans.

Pears were sometimes substituted for apples.

An example for a depression cake recipe is as follows:

Preheat oven to 350°F. Grease a 13 by 9 in baking pan. In a large saucepan, combine 1 cup white sugar, 2 cups firmly packed brown sugar, 2 cups water, 1 cup shortening, 4 cups seedless raisins, 1 tsp cinnamon, 1 tsp nutmeg, 1/2 tsp cloves, and 2 tsp salt. Boil together for 3 minutes, then cool.
Sift together 4 cups flour, 2 1/2 tsp baking powder, 2 tsp baking soda. Add to saucepan, along with 2 cups chopped nuts (optional.) Mix well and pour into baking pan. Bake for 45 minutes.
Remove from oven. Let cool for 10 minutes, then turn onto a cake plate. When thoroughly cool, sprinkle with a little powdered sugar or mix lemon juice and grated lemon rind into powdered sugar for frosting.

This is one example of a depression cake recipe. Other variations may include corn syrup, molasses, brown sugar, and various fruits.  In some instances, bakers would leave the cake unfrosted or sprinkle the top with powdered sugar in lieu of icing. The interchangeability of ingredients makes the recipe for depression cake extremely versatile.

See also

 Bulldog gravy another Great Depression era food
 Wacky cake, a cake that became popular during World War II rationing

References

Cakes
Historical foods